Martina Navratilova won in the final 6–2, 6–4 against Chris Evert-Lloyd.

Seeds
A champion seed is indicated in bold text while text in italics indicates the round in which that seed was eliminated.

  Martina Navratilova (champion)
  Chris Evert-Lloyd (final)
  Wendy Turnbull (fourth round)
  Manuela Maleeva (second round)
  Claudia Kohde-Kilsch (first round)
  Helena Suková (second round)
  Hana Mandlíková (quarterfinals)
  Zina Garrison (third round)
  Kathy Jordan (fourth round)
  Carling Bassett (semifinals)
  Bonnie Gadusek (third round)
  Barbara Potter (quarterfinals)
  Andrea Temesvári (quarterfinals)
  Pam Casale (fourth round)
  Catarina Lindqvist (fourth round)
  Sylvia Hanika (first round)

Draw

Finals

Top half

Section 1

Section 2

Section 3

Section 4

Bottom half

Section 5

Section 6

Section 7

Section 8

References
 1985 Lipton International Players Championships Draw (Archived 2009-07-29)

Women's Singles